The Gardner–Webb Runnin' Bulldogs wrestling team represents Gardner–Webb University as an Associate Member of the Southern Conference of NCAA Division I wrestling (GWU's primary conference, the Big South Conference, does not sponsor wrestling).

History
The Gardner–Webb wrestling program started in 1989–90 season, by Coach Richard Wince. Wince headed the program from 1989–2007, and again from 2009–2012. During Wince's tenure, the Bulldogs had four wrestlers earn All-America honors at the NCAA Division II championships.

In 2001, Gardner–Webb transitioned to NCAA Division I. In 2012, as the program joined the Southern Conference, Wince was succeeded by his associate head coach and former Gardner–Webb wrestler, Daniel Elliott. Elliott was named the 2015 SoCon Co-Coach of the Year.

In 2016, the Runnin' Bulldogs finished as co-champions in the Southern Conference, sending 3 wrestlers to the NCAA Division I Wrestling Championships.

Individual Conference Champions
East Region:
2004 Joshua Pniewski, 133 lbs.
2005 Joshua Pniewski, 133 lbs.
2005 Daniel Elliott, 149 lbs.
2006 Joshua Pniewski, 133 lbs.
2006 Daniel Elliott, 149 lbs.
2006 Adam Glaser, 157 lbs.
2006 Brent Blackwell, 197 lbs.
2007 Rob Tate, 133 lbs.
2007 Dustin Porter, 197 lbs.
2008 Dustin Porter, 197 lbs.
2009 Dustin Porter, 285 lbs.
2010 Dustin Porter, 285 lbs.
2012  Ryan Medved,  149 lbs.
2012  Alex Medved , 157 lbs.
2012 Jonathan Velazquez, 184 lbs.
2012 Travis Porter, 197 lbs.
Southern Conference:
2013 Hunter Gamble, 174 lbs. 
2016 Austin Trott, 165 lbs. 
2017 Ryan Mosley, 157 lbs. (Most Outstanding Wrestler)
2018 Tyler Marinelli, 157 lbs.
2019 Tyler Marinelli, 165 lbs.

NCAA Division I Wrestling Championship Qualifiers
2003 Eric Wince, 174 lbs.
2004 Joshua Pniewski, 133 lbs.
2005 Joshua Pniewski, 133 lbs.
2005 Daniel Elliott, 149 lbs.
2006 Joshua Pniewski, 133 lbs.
2006 Adam Glaser, 157 lbs.
2006 Daniel Elliott, 149 lbs.
2006 Brent Blackwell, 197 lbs.
2007 Rob Tate, 133 lbs.
2007 Dustin Porter, 197 lbs.
2008 Dustin Porter, 197 lbs.
2008 Eddie McCray, 149 lbs.
2009 Dustin Porter, 285 lbs.
2010 Dustin Porter, 285 lbs.
2012 Jonathan Velazquez, 184 lbs.
2012 Travis Porter, 197 lbs.
2012 Ryan Medved, 149 lbs.
2012 Alex Medved, 157 lbs.
2013 Hunter Gamble, 174 lbs.
2014 Austin Trott, 165 lbs.
2015 Ryan Mosley, 149 lbs.
2016 Chris Vassar, 149 lbs.
2016 Austin Trott, 165 lbs.
2016 Boyce Cornwell, 285 lbs.
2017 Ryan Mosley, 157 lbs.
2017 Austin Trott, 174 lbs.
2017 Hunter Gamble, 184 lbs.
2018 Tyler Marinelli, 157 lbs.
2019 Tyler Marinelli, 165 lbs.
2021 RJ Mosley, 165 lbs.
2021 Jha'Quan Anderson, 184 lbs.
2022 RJ Mosley, 165 lbs.

References

External links
Runnin' Bulldogs athletic website

 
1989 establishments in North Carolina
Sports clubs established in 1989